Lucas Oil Indianapolis Raceway Park (formerly Indianapolis Raceway Park, O'Reilly Raceway Park at Indianapolis, and Lucas Oil Raceway) is an auto racing facility in Brownsburg, Indiana, United States, about  northwest of downtown Indianapolis. It includes a  oval track, a  road course (which has fallen into disrepair and is no longer used), and a  drag strip which is among the premier drag racing venues in the world. The complex receives about 500,000 visitors annually.

History

In 1958, 15 Indianapolis-area businessmen and racing professionals led by Tom Binford, Frank Dickie, Rodger Ward, and Howard Fieber invested $5,000 each to fund the development of a  farm tract into a recreational sporting complex that would focus on auto racing. The original intention was to create a 15-turn,  road course, but as an insurance measure against economic problems, the investment group decided to incorporate a quarter-mile drag strip into the long straightaway of the  road course design. Constructed with assistance from the National Hot Rod Association (NHRA), the drag strip was the first to be completed, with the facility's first event held on the strip in the fall of 1960. The facility was called Indianapolis Raceway Park. A year later, a  paved oval was completed to finish off the track capabilities of the complex. The oval track was used as-is until an overall track renovation was completed in 1988 in order to increase speed on the track.

The single NHRA event held at the facility is the oldest and most prestigious of the series. The NHRA U.S. Nationals, held every year during the Labor Day weekend, is the only event on the NHRA schedule with final eliminations scheduled on a Monday. An all-star style race, called the Traxxas Nitro Shootout, is held for the two nitro divisions (Top Fuel on Saturday and Funny Car on Sunday). The winners in each division win $100,000 US, while the race itself has the largest purse of any NHRA sanctioned event at over $250,000 US. The drag strip has held the event every year since 1961, when the race was moved from Detroit.

Sprint and midget races are held on the oval, along with other events suited to a shorter track. Raceway Park traditionally stages an extensive program on the Saturday nights of major races at the Indianapolis Motor Speedway. On Memorial Day weekend, the venue hosts a USAC Silver Crown, Sprint Car and Midget Car event, serving as something of an unofficial preliminary event to the Indianapolis 500. It was previously held on Saturday Night under the name Night before the 500, and is currently held on Friday night as the Carb Night Classic. Similarly, the NASCAR Nationwide Series Kroger 200 was given a "Night before the 400" status; a Truck Series race was added to the weekend in 1995. When Formula One raced at IMS, midget, sprint, and stock car races were held at ORP in the "Night Before F1" meets, including the 2002 and 2003 USGP races that featured a twin 25-lap midget format, with a full inversion, and the winner winning $50,000 if they could win both features.

The , 15-turn road course, was used by the Indianapolis area Sports Car Club of America road racing events.  The initial Indianapolis Raceway Park road race was an SCCA event held in 1961.  In 1965, rookie driver Mario Andretti won his first Indy car race on the road course, in an event which was historic in that it was the first time in modern history that American Indy cars raced on a road circuit.  For the next six years, the road course hosted the Hoosier Grand Prix, a round of the USAC National Championship Series, the same series that included the Indianapolis 500, as well as the USAC Stock Car series.  Notably, in the 1969 movie Winning, Paul Newman's character, Frank Capua, competes in a USAC Stock Car event on the road course.

After an insurance investigation of the pit out opening for the road course, which is located along the left lane wall of the drag strip, the insurance carrier demanded the pit out be closed off with a permanent concrete wall.  This effectively meant closing the road course for competition purposes, as there is no other area on the current track layout suitable to relocate a viable pit lane. However, club racing and private testing used a section of track that runs parallel to the backstretch of the oval (Turns 6–8) as a makeshift pit, although enough section of the return road for the drag strip could also be used if realigned. The last SCCA club road race was held in 2007. The road course surface is in disrepair and very bumpy, and would need improvement to be of use again. There are plans to redesign and renovate the road course, but track officials say it is a long term goal.

In 2012, it was announced that the NASCAR Nationwide Series race at Lucas Oil Raceway would move to Indianapolis Motor Speedway as the Indiana 250 to replace the Kroger 200, and that it would be joined by Rolex Sports Car Series and Continental Tire Sports Car Challenge races under the banner "Super Weekend at the Brickyard". The Camping World Truck Series event was replaced with a new event at Eldora Speedway. As a result, the ARCA Racing Series became the lone national stock car racing series to sanction a race at the track, running its own 200-lap event. NASCAR announced in September 2021 that the Truck Series would return to Lucas Oil Raceway in 2022 as the first playoff race, marking the return by NASCAR after an eleven year absence. On December 8, 2021, the track announced that it would be renaming to Lucas Oil Indianapolis Raceway Park.

Track configurations

Records

.686-mile oval
Qualifying records
 SCCA Formula Super Vee Qualifying: Mark Smith, 19.581 sec. = , May 27, 1989
 Indy Pro 2000 Championship Qualifying: Matthew Brabham, 19.744 sec. = , May 25, 2013
 USAC Silver Crown Champ Car Series Qualifying: Jason Leffler, 20.298 sec. = , May 20, 2000
 U.S. F2000 National Championship Qualifying: Bryan Sellers, 21.016, May 25, 2002
 ARCA/CRA Super Series Qualifying: Evan Jackson, 21.284, September 22, 2007
 NASCAR Nationwide Series Qualifying: David Green, 21.766 sec. = , August 5, 1994
 NASCAR Craftsman Truck Series Qualifying: Joe Ruttman, 22.081 sec. = , August 3, 2000
 ARCA Racing Series Qualifying: Ty Gibbs, 21.820 sec. = , October 10, 2019

Race lap records
 Indy Pro 2000 Championship Race: Matthew Brabham, 20.174 s =, May 25, 2013
 USAC Silver Crown Champ Car Series Race: Mike Bliss, 21.415 s =, May 12, 2001 (100 laps)
 U.S. F2000 National Championship Race: Bryan Sellers, 21.016 s =, May 25, 2002
 NASCAR Nationwide Series Race: Jimmy Hensley, 25.258 s =, June 22, 1985
 NASCAR Craftsman Truck Series Race: Greg Biffle, 27.841 s =, August 5, 1999
 ARCA Racing Series Race: Brandon Jones, 27.962 s =, July 25, 2014

2.5-mile road course
Source:
 IMSA WSC Race: Eliseo Salazar, Ferrari 333 SP, 1:23.622 sec. = , July 10, 1994
 SCCA Formula Atlantic Race: Larry Connor, Ralt RT41, 1:24.529 sec. = , July 1, 2000
 IMSA GTS Race: Irv Hoerr, Oldsmobile Cutlass Supreme, 1:27.451 sec. = , July 10, 1994
 SCCA Formula Continental Race: Jeff Shafer, Nemesis, 1:29.771 sec. = , July 1, 1997
 SCCA A Sports Racer Race: Jerry Hansen, Lola T333, 1:25.880 sec. = , May 1, 1980
 SCCA C Sports Racer Race: Tony Coniewski, Swift, 1:27.130 sec. = , July 4, 2004
 IMSA GTO Race: Joe Pezza, Ford Mustang, 1:32.515 sec. = 
 IMSA GTU Race: Jim Pace, Nissan 240SX, 1:34.479 sec. = 
 FIA Group 4 Race: Peter Gregg, Porsche Carrera RSR, 1:40.200 sec. = , October 14, 1973
 USAC Formula Junior Race: Jim Hall, Lotus 18, 1:42.400 sec. = , July 29, 1962
 Sports car Race: Augie Pabst, Scarab Mk. II, 1:50.500 sec. = , June 25, 1961

Major events
 NHRA – Dodge//SRT NHRA U.S. Nationals (1961–present)
 NASCAR Craftsman Truck Series – TSport 200 (1995–2011, 2022–present)
 ARCA Menards Series – Reese's 200 (1983–1985, 2011–2012, 2014–2020, 2022–present)
 USF Pro 2000 Championship (2010–2016, 2018–present)
 USF2000 Championship (2010–2016, 2018–present)
 USAC Silver Crown Series – Dave Steele Carb Night Classic (2015–present), Hoosier Hundred (2023)

Former
 Hoosier Grand Prix – USAC RRC, USAC National Championship, IMSA GT (1961–1963, 1965–1970, 1973, 1994)
 USAC P1 Insurance National Midget Championship – Night before the 500 – (1969–1971, 1974–2014) – Midgets were swapped with Silver Crown cars beginning in 2015.
 NASCAR Nationwide Series – Kroger 200 (1982–2011)
 NASCAR Busch North Series (1987–1990)
 NASCAR Winston Modified Tour (1988–1989)
 Fast Masters (1993)
 ASA National Tour (1997–2004)
 Hooters Pro Cup Series (2001–2002, 2004–2006)
 Superstar Racing Experience (2021)

References

External links

 
 Lucas Oil Raceway at Indianapolis Page on NASCAR.com

Sports venues in Indianapolis
Motorsport in Indianapolis
NASCAR tracks
ARCA Menards Series tracks
NHRA Division 3 drag racing venues
Motorsport venues in Indiana
IMSA GT Championship circuits
Lucas Oil
Hendricks County, Indiana